Chicago Innerview is an independent music magazine covering live music and events in Chicago. The free monthly magazine was founded in 2003 by journalist Jay Gentile with a focus on previewing local concerts and was expanded in 2008 to cover national politics, including the 2008 Democratic National Convention. The magazine also publishes a live music calendar as well as special festival issues dedicated to the Pitchfork Music Festival and Lollapalooza festival taking place in Chicago each summer.

References

External links
 Official website

Monthly magazines published in the United States
Music magazines published in the United States
Free magazines
Local interest magazines published in the United States
Magazines established in 2003
Magazines published in Chicago
Works about Chicago